Lobelia feayana, the bay lobelia, is a species of bellflower endemic to Florida. A perennial dicot in the Campanulaceae family, it grows in moist areas such as ditches and is often spotted along roadsides. When clustered, the flowers have been described as appearing as a purple haze. It is pollinated by bees and the colors of the five petaled flowers vary from "bluish to lavender to purplish-pink". It is sometimes mistaken for blue toadflax (Linaria canadensis) which can also grow in groupings.

References

feayana